Sieff is a surname. Notable people with the surname include:

Adam Sieff (born 1954), Communications Director at Dune Music, and a former Sony Music Director of Jazz
Israel Sieff, Baron Sieff (1889–1972), British businessman
Jeanloup Sieff (1933–2000), fashion photographer
Joseph Sieff (1906–1982), businessman and British Zionist
Marcus Sieff, Baron Sieff of Brimpton OBE (1913–2001), Jewish British businessman, chairman of Marks & Spencer from 1972 to 1982